Time and Withering is the debut album by the sludge metal band Mouth of the Architect. Recorded at Cylo Studios in Nashville, TN, between 14 and 16 May 2004. It was released on Translation Loss Records on CD only in 2004.

Track listing

Personnel
Alex Vernon – vocals, guitar
Gregory Lahm – vocals, guitar
Jason Watkins - vocals, keyboards
Derik Sommer – bass guitar
Dave Mann - drums
Chris Common - producer, engineer, mixer, mastering
Dan Rizer - layout
Germ? - sketches

References

Mouth of the Architect albums
2004 debut albums